The Lost Zeppelin is a 1929 sound adventure film directed by Edward Sloman and produced and distributed by Tiffany-Stahl. The film stars Conway Tearle, Virginia Valli and Ricardo Cortez.

Tearle plays a navy officer modeled on U. S. Navy Commander Richard Evelyn Byrd who was then a national aviation hero. Byrd made his own genuine Antarctic adventure With Byrd at the South Pole film during his South Pole Expedition 1928-1929.

Plot
At a banquet preceding his flight to the South Pole, Commander Donald Hall (Conway Tearle), a Zeppelin commander in charge of the "Explorer", learns that his wife, Miriam (Virginia Valli), whom he worships, requests a divorce. She is in love with Lieutenant Tom Armstrong (Ricardo Cortez), his best friend and partner in the flight. Hall agrees to grant the divorce after the flight.

When the Zeppelin reaches the South Pole, a sudden gale causes it to crash and the men divide up into search parties. An aircraft with room for only one survivor leads to a decision by Hall that Armstrong should be the one to be saved.

Armstrong is welcomed in Washington as the only survivor but finds that Miriam still loves her husband. Later, news comes of Hall's rescue and miraculous recovery, and he is happily reunited with his wife.

Cast

Conway Tearle as Commander Donald Hall
Virginia Valli as Miriam Hall
Ricardo Cortez as Tom Armstrong
Duke Martin as Lieutenant Wallace
Kathryn McGuire as Nancy
Winter Hall as Mr. Wilson
uncredited
Richard Cramer as Radio Announcer
Ervin Nyiregyhazi as Pianist
William H. O'Brien as Radio Operator

Production
The stagey early part of The Lost Zeppelin was dominated by a banquet scene and actors engaged in dialogue from static positions.  The "shoddy production" values described by aviation film historian Michael Paris in From the Wright Brothers to Top gun: Aviation, Nationalism, and Popular Cinema (1995) were typical of the early sound film era.

The Zeppelin in The Lost Zeppelin is recreated in stock footage of flights, and the use of miniatures as well as a mockup of the gondola. Although technically, the special effects were satisfactory for the era, aviation film historian James H. Farmer in Celluloid Wings: The Impact of Movies on Aviation (1984) considered The Lost Zeppelin had "disappointing special effects and triangular plot."

Reception
Mordaunt Hall in his review for The New York Times gave a mostly negative review of  The Lost Zeppelin, "Presumably the producers of "The Lost Zeppelin," an audible pictorial melodrama now at the Gaiety, do not believe in a very high order of intelligence among cinema audiences, for the best that can be said of the film is that it appears to have been fashioned with a view to appealing to boys from 8 to 10 years of age. Several such youngsters were at the first showing of this offering last Saturday afternoon, and they became volubly enthusiastic over the Antarctic blizzard, the far from impressive airship, the artificial ice fields and the clumsily designed chain of incidents."

Preservation status
The Lost Zeppelin is listed  as "preserved" in the Library of Congress database. The film has also been released on Alpha DVD.

See also
With Byrd at the South Pole (1929)
Dirigible (1931)

References

Notes

Citations

Bibliography

 Farmer, James H. Celluloid Wings: The Impact of Movies on Aviation (1st ed.). Blue Ridge Summit, Pennsylvania: TAB Books 1984. .
 Paris, Michael. From the Wright Brothers to Top gun: Aviation, Nationalism, and Popular Cinema. Manchester, UK: Manchester University Press, 1995. .
 Pendo, Stephen. Aviation in the Cinema. Lanham, Maryland: Scarecrow Press, 1985. .
 Wynne, H. Hugh. The Motion Picture Stunt Pilots and Hollywood's Classic Aviation Movies. Missoula, Montana: Pictorial Histories Publishing Co., 1987. .

External links
The Lost Zeppelin at IMDb.com

The Lost Zeppelin available for free download @ Internet Archive

1929 films
American adventure films
Films directed by Edward Sloman
Tiffany Pictures films
American aviation films
American black-and-white films
1929 adventure films
1920s American films